Knightmare is a video  game released by Activision in 1987 for ZX Spectrum, Amstrad CPC, Commodore 64, and Atari ST. It was written by Mev Dinc, J.P. Dean, E.M. Dean and Nick Cooke, and is based on the Anglia Television show Knightmare. Four years later, Mindscape released entirely different game based on the show, also called Knightmare, for the Atari ST and Amiga.

Gameplay
The player is trapped in a dungeon and must attempt to escape by solving various puzzles. Casting spells is also a part of the gameplay. There are six spells: Anvil, Casper, Alchemy, Ice, Toad and Metamorph. Each has a unique result. The game is controlled by using both the joystick and keyboard. Foes include spiders and monsters.

Reception
Zzap!64 reviewed the Commodore 64 version of the game and said Knightmare is a pretty tough game, but is worth playing if you are an adventure game fan. It noted that the audio in the game is poor, with no music and only sound effects. The magazine rated the game 66 percent. Sinclair User magazine rated the game highly, drawing attention to the interesting subplots and the originality of the gameplay. Computer and Video Games magazine said that the gameplay in Knightmare is much simpler than the concept used in the television show. The magazine praised the puzzles and style, calling Knightmare a thoroughly enjoyable game.

References

External links
 
 Knightmare at CPC Wiki
 Knightmare at Atari Mania

1987 video games
Adventure games
Amstrad CPC games
Amiga games
Atari ST games
Commodore 64 games
ZX Spectrum games
Video games developed in the United Kingdom